Chinnabbayi  is a 1996 Telugu-language romantic comedy film directed by K. Viswanath and produced by M. Narasimha Rao under Raasi Movies. It stars Venkatesh, Ramya Krishnan and Ravali , with music composed by Ilaiyaraaja. The film was a flop at the box office. The film was dubbed in Tamil as College Galatta.

Cast

 Venkatesh as Sundaraiah
 Ramyakrishna as Indira Devi
 Ravali as Satyavathi
 Indraja as Lalitha
 Satyanarayana
 Kota Srinivasa Rao
 Subhalekha Sudhakar
 Satya Prakash
 AVS
 Sakshi Ranga Rao
 Suthivelu
 Chitti Babu
 Misro
 Rajasimha
 Jeet Mohan Mitra
 Srividya
 Srilakshmi
 Siva Parvathi
 Nagaraja Kumari 
 Meena Kumari
 Parvathi 
 Master Anilraj

Soundtrack

Music composed by Ilaiyaraaja. Music released on T-Series Audio Company.

References

External links
 

1997 films
1990s Telugu-language films
Films scored by Ilaiyaraaja
Films directed by K. Viswanath